Hallunda is a part of Botkyrka Municipality, Stockholm County, Sweden.  Hallunda and Norsborg are continuous suburbs. Around 79% of the population of Hallunda are of Non-Swedish descent.

See also
Hallunda metro station

Stockholm urban area